Greatest Hits is a 2001 compilation album by the Doobie Brothers. Its 20 songs appear in chronological order of original release, except for their debut single "Nobody" being placed at track 7 because it was reissued in 1974 to greater chart success than its original release. Greatest Hits peaked at number 142 on the US Billboard 200 and it also peaked at number 45 on the UK Albums Chart.

Reception  

Stephen Thomas Erlewine from Allmusic says this collection has all the band's big songs and provides "an excellent introduction-cum-summary of one of the most popular singles-oriented pop/rock bands of the '70s."

Track listing

Credits
Credits per AllMusic and original studio album liner notes:

The Doobie Brothers
Tom Johnston - lead vocals (1,3,4,5,6,7,9,19), backing vocals, lead and rhythm guitars (1-9, 19-20), harmonica (4)
Patrick Simmons - lead vocals (2,8,13,16,20), backing vocals, lead and rhythm guitars (all tracks)
John Hartman - drums, percussion (except 15,17,18)
Dave Shogren - bass, backing vocals (7)
Tiran Porter - bass, backing vocals (except 7)
Michael Hossack - drums, percussion (1-6, 8, 19-20)
Jeff Baxter – lead and rhythm guitars (9-14, 16)
Keith Knudsen - drums, percussion, backing vocals (9-18)
Michael McDonald - lead vocals (10,11,12,14,15,17,18), backing vocals, keyboards, synthesizers (10-18)
Bobby LaKind - congas, backing vocals (10-19)
John McFee - rhythm guitars, backing vocals (17,18)
Cornelius Bumpus - lead vocals (17), backing vocals, tenor saxophone, organ (17,18)
Chet McCracken - drums (17,18)

Additional musicians
Bill Payne - piano (1,6,19), organ (2), synthesizers (14,15)
Ted Templeman - percussion, drums (14)
Novi Novog - viola (8)
Bobbye Hall - congas (9)
Sherlie Matthews, Venetta Fields, Jessie Smith – backing vocals (9)
Jesse Butler - organ (11)
The Memphis Horns - horns (11,16,19)
Rosemary Butler – backing vocals (12,16)
Nicolette Larson – backing vocals (16,18)
Patrick Henderson - keyboards (18)
Paul Riser - string and horn arrangement (9)
David Paich – string and horn arrangements (12,13)
Jimmie Haskell – string arrangement (18)

Charts

References

2001 greatest hits albums
The Doobie Brothers compilation albums
Warner Records compilation albums
Rhino Entertainment compilation albums
Albums produced by Ted Templeman
Albums produced by Rodney Mills